Didier Angibeaud-Nguidjol  (born 8 October 1974) is a Cameroonian former professional footballer played as a midfielder.

He played for Le Havre, FC Istres, Toulon and OGC Nice in France and also for Sturm Graz in Austria.

He played for Cameroon national football team and was a participant at the 1998 FIFA World Cup.

References

External links
 

1974 births
Living people
Footballers from Douala
Association football midfielders
Cameroonian footballers
Cameroon international footballers
1998 FIFA World Cup players
Ligue 1 players
Ligue 2 players
Championnat National players
Austrian Football Bundesliga players
FC Istres players
Le Havre AC players
OGC Nice players
SC Toulon players
SK Sturm Graz players
Cameroonian expatriate footballers
Expatriate footballers in France
Expatriate footballers in Austria